Ophionectria is a genus of fungi in the family Nectriaceae.

Species

Ophionectria africana
Ophionectria ambigua
Ophionectria annonae
Ophionectria anomala
Ophionectria balladynae
Ophionectria belonospora
Ophionectria briardii
Ophionectria calamicola
Ophionectria cinnabarina
Ophionectria clerodendri
Ophionectria cockerellii
Ophionectria conica
Ophionectria conoidea
Ophionectria cupularum
Ophionectria episphaeria
Ophionectria everhartii
Ophionectria foliicola
Ophionectria globosa
Ophionectria hendrickxii
Ophionectria hidakaeana
Ophionectria hyphicola
Ophionectria lagunensis
Ophionectria lobayenis
Ophionectria luxurians
Ophionectria macrorostrata
Ophionectria magniverrucosa
Ophionectria mellina
Ophionectria muscivora
Ophionectria oubanguiensis
Ophionectria portoricensis
Ophionectria rostrellata
Ophionectria rubicola
Ophionectria scolecospora
Ophionectria tetraspora
Ophionectria theobromae
Ophionectria trichiae
Ophionectria trichospora
Ophionectria ulicis
Ophionectria uredinicola
Ophionectria vernoniae

External links
 

Nectriaceae genera